Ḥayyim Asahel (before 1746) was a rabbi and author who lived in Salonica during the first half of the eighteenth century.

He was the son of Benjamin Asahel, the chief rabbi of that city. Ḥayyim Asahel was the author of a Hebrew work entitled Sam ḥayyai ('Spice of My Life'), a collection of addresses and responsa, which was published after his death by his son Benjamin (Salonica, 1746). He lived for some years at Jerusalem, and was commissioned to collect subscriptions throughout Asia Minor for the poor of Palestine. He died at Smyrna while on this mission.

Bibliography

References
 

Date of birth unknown
Date of death unknown
18th-century deaths
18th-century rabbis from the Ottoman Empire
Rabbis from Thessaloniki
Writers from Thessaloniki
Sephardi rabbis in Ottoman Palestine